Amphisbaena caeca, commonly known as the Puerto Rican worm lizard or blind worm lizard, is a species of worm lizard endemic to Puerto Rico. These animals are vermicular reptiles that live under logs, rocks, and dirt. Other species of Amphisbaenids in the Caribbean include Amphisbaena bakeri, Amphisbaena fenestrata, Amphisbaena schmidti, Amphisbaena xera, and Cadea blanoides.

Amphisbaenids are legless, worm-like reptiles with elongated bodies nearly uniform in diameter. They are covered with ring-like scales similar in appearance to earthworms. They are underground animals, hence the eyes have degenerated to tiny indistinct spots under the rings.

Description
Amphisbaena caeca is pinkish-brown on the head and tail, with dark spots on each of the scales found throughout its annuli (body rings), of which there are between 214 and 237 in this species. This helps distinguish it from A. bakeri, whose annuli count is greater. Like other members of its clade, it has only one median tooth. Because it is somewhat difficult to distinguish its head from its tail, it is sometimes referred to as a "two-headed snake" ("culebra de dos cabezas") by Puerto Rican locals. According to folklore, wearing a live Amphisbaena on the body "helps safeguard pregnancy" while wearing a dead snake "helps rheumatism".

Habits
They can be found burrowing in the ground under logs, rocks, old tree stumps, and under termite and ant nests.

Habitat
They live in dense woodlands, thickets, and caves.

Geographic range
They have also been found in Isla Vieques, Isla Culebra, and the Virgin Islands.

See also

List of amphibians and reptiles of Puerto Rico
List of endemic fauna of Puerto Rico

References

Further reading
Boulenger, G.A. 1885. Catalogue of the Lizards in the British Museum (Natural History). Second Edition. Volume II...Amphisbænidæ. London: Trustees of the British Museum (Natural History). (Taylor and Francis, printers.) xiii + 497 pp. + Plates I.- XXIV. (Amphisbæna cæca, pp. 445–446.)
Cuvier, G. 1829. Le Règne Animal Distribué, d'après son Organisation, pour servir de base à l'Histoire naturelle des Animaux et d'Introduction à l'Anatomie Comparé. Avec Figures desinées, d'après Nature. Nouvelle Édition, Revue et Augmentée. Tome II. [Reptiles] Paris: Déterville. xv + 406 pp. (Amphisbæna caeca, p. 73.)
Rivero, J.A. 1978. Los Anfibios y Reptiles de Puerto Rico: The Amphibians and Reptiles of Puerto Rico. San Juan: Editorial de la Universidad de Puerto Rico. 375 pp. .
Schwartz, A., and R. Thomas. 1975. A Check-list of West Indian Amphibians and Reptiles. Special Publication No. 1. Pittsburgh, Pennsylvania: Carnegie Museum of Natural History. 216 pp. (Amphisbaena caeca, p. 166.)

External links
Caribbean National Forest
Kignsnake: The Reptile and Amphibian hobbyist

Reptiles of Puerto Rico
caeca
Reptiles described in 1829
Taxa named by Georges Cuvier